Ranjani Shettar was born in 1977 in Bangalore, India. She is a visual artist, who is known for her large-scale sculptural installations (see exhibitions). She currently lives and works in Karnataka, India.

Career
Artworks by Ranjani Shettar can be found in a number of leading public collections, including The Metropolitan Museum of Art, San Francisco Museum of Modern Art (SFMoMA), Museum of Modern Art (MoMA), Kiran Nadar Museum of Art (KNMA) and the Walker Art Center.

Shettar received her Bachelors of Fine Arts (Sculpture) in 1998 and her Masters of Fine Arts (Sculpture) in 2000, from the College of Fine Art Karnataka Chitrakala Parishath and the Institute of Advanced Studies Karnataka Chitrakala Parishath in Bangalore respectively.

Work
Shettar's projects are mostly sculptural, however she has experimented in other forms as well. One such project is Varsha, an artist's book in collaboration with The Museum of Modern Art (New York). The covers are made of zinc-alloy with silver inlay and the pages consist of 16 prints accordion book inspired by different Monsoon rains in India and a special text by Anita Desai. There are silkscreen and wood block prints, etching and laser prints. Shettar's works have been the subject of various publications from National Gallery of Victoria, Melbourne and galleries like Talwar Gallery and Marian Goodman Gallery. Shettar has also been awarded with the Hebbar Foundation award in 1999 and 2003, as well as the Charles Wallace Trust Award in 2004, the Sanskriti award in 2008, and the Aditya Vikram Birla Kalakiran Puraskar in 2011 for her works.

Selected exhibitions

Solo exhibitions 
 2019  The Phillips Collection, Earth Songs for a Night Sky, Washington DC, US 
 2018 The Metropolitan Museum of Art, Seven ponds and a few raindrops, New York, NY, US
 Talwar Gallery, On and on it goes on, New York, NY, US
 2017  Talwar Gallery, Bubble trap and a double bow, New Delhi, India
2014  Talwar Gallery, Night skies and daydreams, New York, New York 
 Talwar Gallery, Between the sky and earth, New Delhi, India
 2012  Dr. Bhau Daji Lad Museum in Mumbai, High tide for a blue moon,  India 
Museum of Modern Art, Varsha, Artist's Book in New York City 
 2011  National Gallery of Victoria, Dewdrops and Sunshine, in Melbourne, Australia
 Hermes Foundation, Flame of The Forest, in Singapore 
 Talwar Gallery, Present Continuous, New Delhi, India
 2009  San Francisco Museum of Modern Art, New Work, in San Francisco, California (2009)
 2008  The Modern Art Museum of Fort Worth,  FOCUS, in Fort Worth, Texas 
 Institute of Contemporary Art, Boston, Momentum 10, in Boston, Massachusetts
 2007  Talwar Gallery, Epiphanies, New York, New York
 2004  Talwar Gallery, Indian Spring, New York, New York:

Group Exhibitions
 2017  Pizzuti Collection, Visions from India, Columbus, OH, US
 2013  5th Moscow Biennale of Contemporary Art, Moscow, Russia
 Kiran Nadar Museum of Art, Seven Contemporaries, New Delhi, India
 2012  Henry Art Gallery, Now Here is also Nowhere, University of Washington, Seattle, WA, US
 Kiran Nadar Museum of Art, Crossings, New Delhi, India
 2011  Pizzuti Collection, Teasers, Columbus, OH, US
 Museum of Contemporary Art, barely there (Part III), Detroit, Michigan, US
 Kiran Nadar Museum of Art, Time Unfolded, New Delhi, India
 Art Tower Mito, Quiet Attentions, Mito, Japan
 2010  Museum of Modern Art (MoMA), On Line, New York, NY, US
 10th Liverpool Biennial, Touched, Liverpool, England
 2009  San Francisco Museum of Modern Art, Sculpture Garden Inaugural Exhibition, CA
 2008  Carnegie Museum of Art, Life on Mars: 55th Carnegie International, Pittsburgh, PA
 2007  9th Lyon Biennial, Lyon, France
 8th Sharjah Biennale, Sharjah, UAE
 2006  XV Sydney Biennale, Zones of Contact, Sydney, Australia
 Marian Goodman Gallery, Freeing the line, New York, NY, US
 ARTPACE, Artist in Residence, San Antonio, TX, US
 2005  Fine Arts Center, University of Massachusetts, Transition & Transformation, MA, US
 Foundation Cartier pour l'art contemporain, J'en reve (Dream on), Paris, France
 Sainsbury Centre for Visual Arts, Out There, Norwich, UK
 Talwar Gallery, (desi)re, New York, NY, US
 Wexner Center for the Arts, Landscape Confection, Columbus, Ohio and travel
 Orange County Museum of Art, Newport Beach, CA, US
 Contemporary Arts Museum Houston, Houston, Texas, US
 2004  Khoj International, New Delhi, India
 2003  Walker Art Center, How Latitudes Become Forms, Minneapolis, MN and travel
 Fondazione Sandretto Re Rebaudengo Per L'Arte, Torino, Italy
 Contemporary Arts Museum Houston, Houston, Texas, US
 2000  Synergy Art Foundation, Concept Shop, Bangalore, India

Publications
2017- Ranjani Shettar:  Between the sky and earth, text by Catherine de Zegher, Ranjani Shettar, Deepak Talwar, Talwar Gallery

2011- Ranjani Shettar: Dewdrops and Sunshine, Essay by Alex Baker, National Gallery of Victoria,

2009- Epiphanies, Essay by Marta Jakimowicz, Talwar Gallery

Vitamin 3-D: New Perspectives in Sculpture and Installation, Editors of Phaidon Press 

2006- Freeing the Line, Essay by Catherine de Zegher, Marian Goodman Gallery

2005- Transition and Transformation: A. Balasubramaniam and Ranjani Shettar, Essays by Loretta Yarlow and Deepak Talwar, Published by University Gallery, Fine Arts Center, University of Massachusetts, MA, US

References

External links
 Washington City Press, Ranjani Shettar's Earth Songs for a Night Sky, June 2019
 The New York Times Style Magazine, The South Asian Artists Making Their Mark on the Western Scene, December 2018.
 Artforum, Ranjani Shettar The Metropolitan Museum of Art, September 2018.
 Mint, Ranjani Shettar: Making Waves with Wood, July 2017.
 The New York Times, Ranjani Shettar: Night Skies and Daydreams, September 2014.

1977 births
Living people
Artists from Bangalore
Indian women sculptors
21st-century Indian women artists
21st-century Indian sculptors
Women artists from Karnataka